Gulyantsi Municipality is a municipality (obshtina) in  Pleven Province,  Northern Bulgaria, located along the right bank of Danube river, by the border with Romania. It is named after its administrative centre - the town of Gulyantsi. As of December 2009, the municipality has a total population of 13,561 inhabitants.

The main cultural sight in the municipality are the ruins of the large Ancient Roman city of Ulpia Oescus.

Geography

Gulyantsi municipality has an area of 458 square kilometres, of which 70% is arable. The region is flat, with elevation ranging from 30 to 50 metres above sea level. The northern boundary of the municipality is the Danube River, between river kilometres 604 and 639.

Settlements

Demography 
The following table shows the change of the population during the last four decades.

Religion 
According to the latest Bulgarian census of 2011, the religious composition, among those who answered the optional question on religious identification, was the following:

See also
Provinces of Bulgaria
Municipalities of Bulgaria
List of cities and towns in Bulgaria

References

External links
 Gulyantsi Municipality website  

Municipalities in Pleven Province